Pekka Sylvander (born 10 January 1943) is a Finnish rower. He competed at the 1964 Summer Olympics and the 1968 Summer Olympics.

References

External links
 

1943 births
Living people
Finnish male rowers
Olympic rowers of Finland
Rowers at the 1964 Summer Olympics
Rowers at the 1968 Summer Olympics
People from Salo, Finland
Sportspeople from Southwest Finland